A coquette is a flirtatious woman. It may refer to:

The Coquette (film), a 1917 German silent comedy film
Coquette (film), an Academy Award-winning 1929 film starring Mary Pickford
Coqueta  (1949 film), a Mexican musical film
Coqueta (1983 film), a Mexican musical drama film
"Coquette" (song), 1929 song by Johnny Green and Carmen Lombardo
"Coquette", a song by Irving Berlin
Coquette Productions, the production company of Courteney Cox and David Arquette
The Coquette, a 1797 epistolary novel by Hannah Webster Foster
HMS Coquette, various ships of the British Royal Navy
Coquettes, several species of hummingbird in the genus Lophornis, and the Racket-tailed coquette in the genus Discosura

See also
 Coquet (disambiguation)